To galvanize a metal object is to subject it to galvanization.

Galvanize may also refer to:
 "Galvanize" (song), by the Chemical Brothers
 Galvanized (album), a 2013 album by The Urge
 Galvanize (software company), Vancouver based software company

See also
 Galvanized Yankee, American Civil War prisoners recruited by their respective captors 
 Galvanism, muscular responses to electricity
 Galvanic (disambiguation)